Helen Barbara Howard  (March 10, 1926 – December 7, 2002) was a Canadian painter, wood-engraver, draughtsperson, bookbinder and designer who produced work consistently throughout her life, from her graduation in 1951 from the Ontario College of Art until her unexpected death in 2002.

Her work is represented in many permanent collections, including the National Gallery of Canada, the Art Gallery of Ontario, the British Library, the Bodleian Library in Oxford, United Kingdom and The Library of Congress in Washington. Her work also hangs in private, public and corporate collections in Canada, the United Kingdom and the United States.

Life
Howard was born in Long Branch, Ontario, in 1926, the younger of two children. Her father, Thomas Howard, a secondary school teacher, was an English immigrant. Her mother, Helen Mackintosh, who was born in Winnipeg, was of Scottish ancestry. Having decided early to become an artist, Howard studied at the Ontario College of Art in Toronto from 1948 to 1951, where she was a pupil of Will Ogilvie, who taught her figure drawing, and Jock Macdonald, who taught her painting and composition. In her final year she won the silver medal in drawing and painting.

Howard taught art classes in Toronto until 1953, when she moved to London in the UK, where she studied at Saint Martin's School of Art, immersing herself in the English landscape and the cultural life of postwar London. She also travelled to Europe to visit the art museums of Rome, Venice, Florence, Paris and Madrid, and saw the Paleolithic cave paintings at Lascaux in southwestern France, an experience which influenced many of her later illustrations.  In London she met her future husband, the Canadian poet, Richard Outram. Returning to Canada in 1956, Howard and Outram made their home in Toronto for the next 46 years.

In the late 1950s and early sixties Howard showed regularly at the Picture Loan Society, a Toronto gallery established by Douglas Duncan in 1936 to present the work of contemporary Canadian artists such as Emily Carr, Fred Varley, David Milne, Lawren Harris and A.Y. Jackson. Several Canadian public collections possess Howard drawings and paintings acquired through the Douglas Duncan estate, as Duncan was also a collector of her work.

In 2002, Howard and Outram moved to Port Hope, Ontario, but soon after their arrival Howard fell and broke her hip. While undergoing surgery on 7 December in Peterborough, Ontario, she suffered a pulmonary embolism and died on the operating table.

Work

Howard and her husband were part of a circle of artists, writers and designers who were interested in visual images, in language and in the book arts. One close associate was the graphic designer Allan Fleming, whose Martlet Press published Twenty-Eight Drawings by Barbara Howard in 1970, a period when she was drawing the figure. The Canadian wood engraver Rosemary Kilbourn, a close friend since art college, taught Howard to carve images that could be printed in conjunction with text.

In 1960 Howard and Outram launched the Gauntlet Press, a small private press which produced hand-bound letterpress volumes of Outram's poetry and Howard's wood engravings. These limited editions, prized by collectors, can also be found in such public collections as Library and Archives Canada, the Library of Congress, the British Library and the University of Toronto Thomas Fisher Rare Book Library. Throughout the 1970s and 1980s the Gauntlet Press also issued a series of letterpress broadsheets of Outram's poems, all of them designed (and many illustrated) by Howard. Digital facsimiles of the books and broadsheets of the Gauntlet Press in the collection of the Memorial University of Newfoundland can be viewed at the website dedicated to The Gauntlet Press of Richard Outram and Barbara Howard, together with extensive background material and an exhaustive bibliography.

Imagery derived from the natural world was always at the heart of Howard's painting. Throughout her life she painted horizons, shorelines, skies, sun and water, although she was more concerned with the essence of a subject than with its precise representation.

In her sixties she devoted a decade of work to an extensive series of cetacean studies, Encounters with Whales. In his essay Encounters and Recollections in the Art of Barbara Howard and Richard Outram, the poet Jeffery Donaldson writes: "For the most part, these are portraits of the mammals in something like their private element. Their appearances are brief, ecstatic revelations, fortuitous glimpses, sudden soundings. They seem to break forth abruptly from their solitude and then slip away as quickly again."

In the late 1990s until her death in 2002, Howard returned to her lifelong fascination with light, night skies, the reflective surface of water. In these last paintings, there is a recurrence of circular elements, an abstraction of natural forms and a balancing of darkness and light.  Howard has stated: "In my painting (as in all my work) I am deeply involved with light as the movement and inter-action of colours; the integrity of colour and form, hence with the integrity of the total work which has to do with spirit and abstract essence, not representation. I am preoccupied with life's ambiguities and dualities and in my later work I am reaching more and more from the dark toward light, freedom, and a transcending exuberance."

Howard's paintings, drawings, wood engravings and book designs can be viewed on the website Barbara Howard's Unfolding Visual World.

Critical reception
With the exception of the very large whale canvases, Howard's paintings sold steadily throughout her lifetime. However, while she had her champions, she was never a part of the mainstream of Canadian art and so did not attract the kind of public critical attention that attends most successful careers. In her introduction to the catalogue for Howard's 1980 solo exhibition The Event in the Mind, sculptor Rebecca Sisler wrote:
Classification, school? Barbara Howard's work defies specific slotting, although we sense her recognition of the heritage left by great masters, Turner being the most obvious.

Writing about Howard's wood engravings in her 2006 essay Drawing Attention: Barbara Howard's Ecologies, the artist, curator and academic Martha Fleming states:
Wood engraving is a demanding process, and Howard was a virtuoso. [The creatures she portrayed] echo the floating, frameless engravings pioneered by Thomas Bewick in the 18th century, and yet they are startlingly modern. As much about form as they are about anatomical accuracy, they hover at the brink of typology but have nothing of zoological rendering's reduction to taxonomy. Her counterintuitive use of colour upholds the monochrome dignity inherent in the technique.

Howard was elected to the Royal Canadian Academy of Arts in 1975 and served on the RCA Council from 1980 to 1982.

Collections

Public collections
 National Gallery of Canada
 Art Gallery of Ontario
 Art Gallery of Hamilton
 Art Gallery of Peel, Brampton
 Tom Thomson Art Gallery, Owen Sound
 Art Gallery of Windsor
 Art Gallery of Northumberland, Cobourg
 Museum London, London
 Art Gallery of Greater Victoria
 Glenhyrst Art Gallery of Brant
 Agnes Etherington Art Centre, Kingston
 Kitchener-Waterloo Art Gallery
 Rodman Hall, St. Catharines
 Province of Ontario Collection

Public collections of the Gauntlet Press 
 Library and Archives Canada (formerly the National Library of Canada), Ottawa
 The Thomas Fisher Rare Book Library, University of Toronto
 The Gauntlet Press Collection of the Queen Elizabeth II Library, Memorial University of Newfoundland
 Bruce Peel Special Collections Library, University of Alberta
 The University of British Columbia Library
 University of Western Ontario, London, Ontario
 The MILLS Research Collections, McMaster University, Hamilton, Ontario
 The Trent University Archives, Peterborough, Ontario
 The University of Calgary, Alberta, Special Collections
 The Berg Collection, New York Public Library
 The Harris Collection of Poetry and Plays, Brown University, Providence, Rhode Island
 The Library of Congress, Washington, DC
 University at Buffalo, New York, Special Collections
 The Houghton Library, Harvard University, Cambridge, Massachusetts
 Bodleian Library, Oxford, UK
 The British Library, London

Exhibitions 
The first solo exhibition of Howard's paintings was at Toronto's  Picture Loan Society in 1957. Pearl McCarthy, then art critic for The Globe and Mail, wrote that Howard was "far ahead of most landscapists in depth" and described her work as "first class ... the answer to a permanent sensuous desire".
The last solo exhibition of Howard's paintings and drawings took place posthumously at the Art Gallery of Northumberland, Cobourg, Ontario, in 2006. 

Solo exhibitions of Howard's work and/or the Gauntlet Press
 Picture Loan Society, Toronto 1957, 1958, 1960, 1965
 Wells Gallery, Ottawa, 1966, 1982, 1984
 Fleet Gallery, Winnipeg, 1966
 Victoria College, Toronto, 1966
 Sisler Gallery, Toronto, 1974, 1976
 Hart House, University of Toronto, 1975
 The Event in the Mind, Prince Arthur Galleries, Toronto, 1980; catalogue
 Yaneff Gallery, Toronto, 1983
 Massey College, Toronto, 1984
 Latcham Gallery, Stouffville, 1985
 O'Keefe Centre, Toronto, 1986
 National Library of Canada, 1986
 University College, Toronto, 1987
 Georgetown Library & Cultural Centre, 1988
 The Arts and Letters Club of Toronto, 1993
 E.J. Pratt Library, Victoria University, University of Toronto, 1995
 Robarts Library, University of Toronto, 1999
 The Upstairs Gallery, Art Gallery of Northumberland, Port Hope, 2003
 Seeking Light: Last Paintings and Selected Drawings. Art Gallery of Northumberland, Cobourg, 2006; catalogue

Group exhibitions
 Ontario Society of Artists, 1958, 1959
 Women's Committee, Art Gallery of Ontario, 1958, 1969
 Douglas Duncan Collection, Victoria College, Toronto, 1962
 Toronto Collects, Art Gallery of Ontario, 1961
 Women Artists, Canadian National Exhibition, Toronto, 1961
 Canadian Artists, Eaton's College Street, 1961
 Canadian Society of Graphic Arts, 1958, 1959, 1960, 1963
 National Home Show, 1960, 1961, 1962
 C.U.S.A.C. Travelling Show, Hart House, 1958–1959
 Women's Committee, London Art Gallery, 1962
 Canadian Watercolours, Drawings & Prints, National Gallery  of Canada, 1966
 Douglas Duncan Collection, Windsor, London, Hamilton, 1967
 Drawings and Sculpture, Art Gallery of Ontario, 1976
 The Living Image, Macdonald Gallery, Toronto (3 artists); catalogue
 R.C.A. Centennial Contemporary Exhibition, Toronto, 1980
 Inaugural Exhibition, Academy House, R.C.A., Toronto, 1987–1988
 Art Under Fire, Academy House, R.C.A., Toronto, 1988
 Fine Printing: The Private Press in Canada. Travelling exhibition: Toronto, Fredericton, Calgary, Grimsby, Saskatoon,  Brandon, Pointe Claire, Halifax, Saint John, 1995–1997; catalogue
 Women and Texts, University of Leeds, 1997 (curated by Special Collections, University of Calgary); catalogue
 Toronto in Print, Thomas Fisher Rare Book Library, 1998; catalogue
 Earthworks, an exhibition of works by Ontario Academicians, John B. Aird Gallery, Toronto, 1998
 Traces of Land, Traces of People: Contemporary Images of Ontario, Ontario Legislature, Queen's Park, Toronto, November 1999 – July 2000

Bibliography

References

External links
 
 Drawing Attention: Barbara Howard’s Ecologies
 The Gauntlet Press of Richard Outram and Barbara Howard

1926 births
2002 deaths
Artists from Toronto
Members of the Royal Canadian Academy of Arts
Alumni of Saint Martin's School of Art
Canadian women artists
Canadian wood engravers
20th-century engravers